Lake Fundeni is a man-made lake on the Colentina River in Bucharest, Sector 2.

References

See also
List of lakes in Bucharest

Fundeni